The name Megi (Korean: 메기) has been used for four tropical cyclones in the northwestern Pacific Ocean. The name was submitted by South Korea and is a Korean word for catfish.

 Typhoon Megi (2004) (T0415, 18W, Lawin) – moved through the Ryūkyū islands before passing between South Korea and Japan.
 Typhoon Megi (2010) (T1013, 15W, Juan) – an intense typhoon that struck Luzon, causing damages amounting to ₱15 billion, Taiwan and Fujian, China.
 Typhoon Megi (2016) (T1617, 20W, Helen) – Made landfall in Taiwan as a Category 3 typhoon.
 Tropical Storm Megi (2022)  (T2202, 03W, Agaton) – a deadly tropical cyclone that stalled in Leyte Gulf, bringing widespread flooding to the Philippines.
Due to the extensive damage caused by the 2022 incarnation in the Philippines, the name Megi was requested to be retired.

References

Pacific typhoon set index articles